Authentic is the thirteenth studio album by American hip hop recording artist LL Cool J. It was released on April 30, 2013, by S-BRO Music Group, 429 Records. The album was his first album since 2008's Exit 13 and his first to not be released on Def Jam. It features guest appearances from Fitz and The Tantrums, Eddie Van Halen, Snoop Dogg, Fatman Scoop, Seal, Charlie Wilson, Melody Thornton, Earth, Wind & Fire, Bootsy Collins, Travis Barker, Chuck D, Tom Morello, Z-Trip, Mickey Shiloh, Monica and Brad Paisley.

Background
By June 2012, LL Cool J had begun work on his thirteenth studio album. He stated, "I'm going to be doing a little bit of the album on the [My Connect Studio], make sure that it is official." On January 20, 2013, he announced on his Twitter account that the album had been pushed back from its original February 12, 2013 release date. On February 8, 2013, it was announced the album title would be changed from Authentic Hip-Hop to Authentic with a new release date of May 7, 2013, and a new cover. On February 14, 2013, the album's release date was pushed up to April 30, 2013. On March 14, 2013, Eddie Van Halen posted a photo of himself with LL Cool J in front of a mix board. The photo was captioned with "Authentic 4.30.13", suggesting that Eddie would be involved in some way with the album release.

Singles
The first single "Whaddup" was debuted during the live 2013 Grammy Awards telecast, which features Chuck D, Travis Barker, Tom Morello and Z-Trip. On March 18, 2013, the second single "We Came to Party" was released featuring Snoop Dogg and Fatman Scoop. On April 16, the third single "Live for You" featuring country music singer Brad Paisley was released.

Critical response

Authentic received generally mixed reviews from music critics. At Metacritic, which assigns a normalized rating out of 100 to reviews from mainstream critics, the album received an average score of 46, based on 9 reviews. David Jeffries of Allmusic gave the album two and a half stars out of five, saying "LL sounds rusty and a bit under-rehearsed as he belts out his iffy punch lines and motivational anthems, but he pours his heart into the pop numbers and sounds at home during the nostalgic throwbacks." Gerrick Kennedy of the Los Angeles Times gave the album one star out of four, saying "LL Cool J has completely lost touch with what launched him into superstardom: rapping. That startling disconnection is what bogs down his 13th album, Authentic.

Ted Scheinman of Slant Magazine gave the album three out of five stars, saying "Older listeners will find a wistful pleasure in hearing what may be the most heartfelt effort of LL's career." Cristina Jaleru of The Washington Post gave the album two and a half stars out of five, saying "There's nothing wrong with pandering when one tries to hang on to artistic relevance, especially when producing a balanced, intriguing album. Who knows, maybe that's the future of music and Cool James is still a pioneer." Steve Jones of USA Today gave the album two stars out of four, saying "He has an eclectic bunch of guests and while he's obviously not aiming at the teen market, there seems to be a conscious effort to expand the fan base. The result is a mixed bag of party anthems and the rap ballads he pioneered years ago." Julia LeConte of Now gave the album one star out of five, saying "Authentic is ridiculous right down to the heavy-breathing interludes, which worked for Usher circa 2003. LL says he's "hot like 'Pac when he first popped out of prison." I think he's delusional. As far as comedy albums go, however, Authentic is the year's best."

Jay Balfour of HipHopDX gave the album two and a half stars out of five, saying "Unfortunately, Authentic suffers the same fate as LL's other late-career missteps: too many features and a superficial brand of R&B bog down another release from one of rap's earliest superstars." Jody Rosen of Rolling Stone gave the album three out of five stars saying, "On Authentic, LL's first LP not released by Def Jam, the guest list is a testament to open-mindedness and crossover ambitions. The beats are unfussy and direct; the choruses are built for radio." Ken Capobianco of The Boston Globe gave the album a seven out of ten, saying "Metal hip-hop is more compromise than authentic, but much of this disc sounds genuine."

Commercial performance
In its first week of release the album debuted at number 23 on the Billboard 200 and sold 14,000 copies in the United States. In its second week the album sold 5,500 more copies. In its third week the album sold 3,400 more copies. In its fourth week the album sold 2,700 more copies bringing its total sales to 26,000.

Track listing

Notes
 signifies co-producer(s)

Sample credits
"Closer" contains samples of Guy's "I Like".
"Whaddup" contains samples of Public Enemy's "Welcome to the Terrordome".
"Take It" contains samples of The Jones Girls' "When I'm Gone".

Personnel

Cey Adams – creative director
Travis Barker – featured artist
Samuel J. Barnes –  producer
Janette Beckman – photography
Matt Brownlie – assistant
Bootsy Collins – featured artist
Martin Cooke –	engineer
Chuck D – featured artist
Josh Drucker –	assistant
Earth, Wind & Fire – featured artist
Nicolas Essig – assistant
Fatman Scoop –	featured artist
Doug Fenske – engineer, mixing
Stu Fine – A&R
Fitz & the Tantrums – featured artist
Jason Goldstein – engineer
Chris Holmes –	engineer
Jaylien –  producer
David Alan Kogut – art direction, package design
Miguel Lara –	assistant
LL Cool J – liner notes, primary artist
Jared Lynch – assistant
Glen Marchese – engineer, mixing
Monica – featured artist
Tom Morello – featured artist
Jean Claude "Poke" Olivier –  producer
Jeremiah Olvera – assistant
Brad Paisley –	featured artist
Neal H. Pogue – mixing
Herb Powers – mastering
Richard Rich –	assistant  
David Rodriguez – assistant
Seal –	featured artist
Mickey Shiloh –  featured artist
James Todd Smith – executive producer, producer
Snoop Dogg – featured artist
Nancie Stern –	sample clearance
Kyle Stevens – assistant
C. "Tricky" Stewart – engineer, producer
Melody Thornton – featured artist
Eddie Van Halen – featured artist, producer
David Wild – transcription
Charlie Wilson – featured artist
Andrew Wuepper – mixing
Sound Z – producer
Z-Trip – featured artist, producer, scratching

Charts

References

2013 albums
LL Cool J albums
Albums produced by LL Cool J
Albums produced by Trackmasters